Wake Up Dreaming is a Mandopop album by Jacky Cheung, which was released on 22 December 2014ET.

The album was recorded at Abbey Road Studios in August 2014, with Cheung being the first Mandopop singer to produce music at Abbey Road.

Wake Up Dreaming sold over 10,000 on its first day of release in China and was the most popular album in 2014.

Track listing 
All songs produced by Jacky Cheung and Andrew Tuason. All music arranged by Tuason unless otherwise noted.

References 

Jacky Cheung albums
2014 albums
Mandopop albums